Neidpath Viaduct, occasionally known as the Queen's Bridge, consists of eight stone skew arches and was built to carry the Symington to Peebles branch line of the Caledonian Railway over the River Tweed to the south-west of Neidpath Castle. Now closed to rail traffic the bridge is used as a footpath.

History
The Symington, Biggar and Broughton Railway's extension to Peebles was authorised on 3 July 1860 but by the time construction was complete the company had been absorbed by the much larger Caledonian Railway. The bridge was designed by Robert Murray, a local engineer living in Peebles, and George Cunningham, Consultant Engineer to the Caledonian Railway, and built of sandstone ashlar blocks. All eight arches are semicircular, skewed and constructed with helical courses, crossing the Tweed obliquely with four of the piers in the water, and the whole structure is built on a graceful curve of radius  so as to align the route with nearby Neidpath Tunnel, at the eastern end of the viaduct and to the south of Neidpath Castle. In addition to the curve, the level of the trackbed falls approximately 6 feet (1.8 m) from west to east. The similar but smaller Lyne Viaduct is located a little to the west and is often confused with this bridge. On 1 January 1923 ownership of the viaduct, along with the rest of the Caledonian Railway, passed to the London, Midland and Scottish Railway and thence to the Scottish region of British Railways on nationalisation in 1948. The line lost its regular passenger traffic on 5 June 1950 and closed completely on 7 June 1954 but the Category A listed structure, one of the finest examples of skew arch construction in Scotland, remains as part of a footpath, the picturesque setting being popular with ramblers.

Gallery

See also
List of Category A listed buildings in the Scottish Borders
List of listed buildings in Peebles, Scottish Borders

References

Railway bridges in Scotland
Skew bridges
Bridges across the River Tweed
Transport in Scotland
Bridges completed in 1863
Category A listed buildings in the Scottish Borders
Listed bridges in Scotland
Viaducts in Scotland
Stone arch bridges